Goiana (pronounced ) is a city in Brazil in the northeast of the state of Pernambuco, roughly 65 km north of the city of Recife, 51 km from the capital of Paraíba and 2,187 km from Brasília.

Its historic center was declared a National Historic Landmark in 1938. It also has the easternmost continental point in its state, at Ponta do Funil in the coastal district of Ponta de Pedras.

Location

It is built on a fertile plain between the rivers Tracunhaém and Capibaribe mirim near their junction to form the Goiana River, and is 25 km from the coast. It the easternmost city in Pernambuco, and the northernmost coastal city of the state. It is surrounded by, and is the commercial centre for, one of the richest agricultural districts of the state, which produces sugar, rum, coffee, tobacco, cotton, cattle, hides and castor oil. Goiana is one of the oldest towns of the state, and was occupied by the Dutch from 1636 to 1654.

The municipality contains most of the  Acaú-Goiana Extractive Reserve, a sustainable use conservation unit created in 2007.

History 
Originally occupied by Brazilian Indians, Caetés and Potiguaras, the village was elevated to a parish in 1568 when Portuguese explorer Diogo Dias bought 10 thousand fathoms of land near the present city of Goiana, then the Captaincy of Itamaracá, establishing a fortified ingenuity in the Valley of the Rio Tracunhaém. In 1574 the Potiguara population attacked the Tracunhaém sugar plantation, exterminating its entire population. This episode saw and end to the captaincy of Itamaracá and the creation of captaincy of Nova Paraíba.

In January 1640 went up between Goiana and the island of Itamaracá the squad of D. Fernando de Noronha, Count of Torre, and the Dutch, commanded by Corneliszoon Willen, a fight that would be immortalized in four prints of Frans Post.

On April 24, 1646, fitted with sticks, stones, pots, pepper and boiling water, women of Tejucupapo, a small district of the city, won the Dutch that threatened their land and families. Event known and portrayed in this movie called "Epic of heroine of Tejucupapo" that the last Sunday of April is recounted through a theatrical outdoor milestone in the Mother's Club. The production shows the lives of women who fought against the invaders and against prejudice.

Elevated to the post of town on January 15, 1685, the city has earned forums on May 5, 1840, the center of town on August 3, 1892.

Beaches

Carne de Vaca beach
Carne de Vaca (English: beef meat) is the first beach of the north coast of Pernambuco. It has a narrow sand strip, small waves and banks of sand before the natural reefs during low tide. It is located in a small village with few homes. To the north there is the mouth of the Goiana River, and to the south there is the small Doce river.

Pontas de Pedras beach
Has weak waves, fine sand and a lot of algae. It is located in the core of the village, where several fishing boats are always anchored. Together with Carne de Vaca, this beach is one of the most popular beaches in Goiana.

Barra de Catuama beach
This beach still retains some of native atlantic forest vegetation.

Catuama beach
Has clear water, reefs and wet sand. At low tide, there are sand banks, stones and natural pools. It is located close to the village center, where there is a church in devotion to Nossa Senhora da Penha - Our Lady of Penha.

Atapuz beach
Fishermen village, close to the intersection between Itapessoca River and Santa Cruz channel. In town, there is a chapel dedicated to Saint Sebastian.

Tabatinga beach
Has palm trees, mangrove and holiday summer houses. It is located on a private farm.

Economy

The main economic activities in Goiana are based in the automotive, pharmaceutical and glass industries, hosting three important plants in these segments. The city hosts the most modern assembly plant of the Fiat Chrysler Automobiles (FCA Group), which is responsible for the production of the Jeep Renegade and Fiat Toro. Goiana also is the land of Vivix, one of the biggest float glass industry in Brazil and Hemobrás, which produces blood derivatives and coagulation factor products.

Goiana has an important agribusiness sector, especially related to the creation of goats, cattle, pigs, poultry, and plantations of sugarcane and coconuts.

The city is one of the biggest national producer of sugarcane, with an estimated production of over 1.1 million tons in 2007.

Economic Indicators

Economy by Sector
2006

Health Indicators

Historic structures

The historic center of Goiana received provisional status as a national monument by the National Institute of Historic and Artistic Heritage (IPHAN) in 2001. Nine religious structures were designated as national monuments of Brazil in 1938.

Church and Convent of Our Lady of Solitude (Convento e Igreja de Nossa Senhora da Soledade)
Convento e Igreja de Santo Alberto de Sicília
Church of the Third Order of Mount Carmel (Igreja da Ordem Terceira do Carmo)
Igreja de Nossa Senhora da Conceição
Igreja de Nossa Senhora da Misericórdia
Church of Our Lady of Protection (Igreja de Nossa Senhora do Amparo)
Igreja de Nossa Senhora do Rosário dos Pretos
Igreja Matriz de Nossa Senhora do Rosário
Capela de Santo Antônio - Engenho Novo

References

 Video Goiana of the future  

Populated places established in 1892
Populated coastal places in Pernambuco
Municipalities in Pernambuco